Atsabe, officially Atsabe Administrative Post, is an administrative post in Ermera municipality, East Timor. Its seat or administrative centre is Laclo, and its population at the 2004 census was 16,037.

References

External links 

  – information page on Ministry of State Administration site 

Administrative posts of East Timor
Ermera Municipality